Lara Beth Aknin is a Canadian social psychologist. She is an Assistant Professor of Psychology at Simon Fraser University and a Distinguished University Professor.

Career
After earning her PhD from the University of British Columbia, Aknin joined the faculty of psychology at Simon Fraser University in 2012. That year, she published "Giving Leads to Happiness in Young Children" with J. Kiley Hamlin and Elizabeth Dunn, which supported the idea that humans may have evolved to find giving rewarding.

In 2014, Aknin, Michael Norton and Elizabeth Dunn co-published a Social Sciences and Humanities Research Council (SSHRC) and CIHR funded review of whether spending money had a positive effect on people's happiness. The following year, her contributions to the field of social psychology earned her the President’s New Researcher Award from the Canadian Psychological Association and a fellowship at the Canadian Institute for Advanced Research. By 2019, she received a SSHRC grant for her project, “Can Repeated and Reflective Giving Nurture Canada's Next Generation of Philanthropists?” She was also honoured by the university for her research and contributions to social Psychology with the title "Distinguished SFU Professor."

During the COVID-19 pandemic, she served as Chair of the Mental Health and Wellbeing Task Force of the Lancet COVID-19 Commission.  She also serves as an associate editor of the World Happiness Report.

Publications

References

External links 
 

Living people
Place of birth missing (living people)
Year of birth missing (living people)
social psychologists
Canadian women psychologists
Canadian psychologists
Academic journal editors
Canadian women academics
Academic staff of Simon Fraser University
University of British Columbia alumni